Frederic Arnold Kummer Sr. (August 5, 1873 – November 22, 1943) was an American author, playwright and screenwriter. He also wrote under the pseudonym Arnold Fredericks. Several of his works were made into films. A caricature of him is on the wall of Sardi's restaurant.

Early life
Frederic Arnold Kummer was born in Catonsville, Maryland, to Arnold Kummer. His father was a banker and his mother was of Quaker stock. He was educated in public schools and Rensselaer Polytechnic Institute.

Career
Kummer became a life member of the American Society of Civil Engineers and assistant editor of the Railroad Gazette. Kummer became the president of a wood block paving company, but the company failed during the Panic of 1907. Kummer then moved into writing.

Kummer wrote stories and plays. He wrote The Painted Woman and it premiered at the Auditorium Theatre in 1917. It came to Baltimore in 1938 as the opera Captive, with music by Gustav Strube.

In testimony to the Special Committee on Un-American Activities, he was noted as a member of the Lincoln Brigade executive committee.

Personal life
Kummer built a house in Guilford, Maryland. He later moved to West Lafayette and later Park Avenue in Baltimore.

Kummer married twice. He first married playwright Clare Kummer with whom he had two children. He also had three more children. His son Frederic Arnold Kummer Jr. was also a writer.

In 1927, Kummer was hospitalized at Union Memorial Hospital and newspapers reported his death. He died on November 22, 1943, at his home at 1501 Park Avenue in Baltimore. He was buried at Loudon Park Cemetery.

Legacy
A Liberty Ship was named after him during World War II.

Filmography
Adventure of the Absent Minded Professor (1914)
Adventure of the Counterfeit Money (1914)
Adventure of the Missing Legacy (1914)
The Yellow Pawn (1916)
The Belgian (1917)
The Slave Market (1917)
The Town Scandal (1923)

Bibliography

Richard and Grace Duvall
The Blue Lights: A Detective Story
The Brute
The Film of Fear
The First Days of Man
The Green God
The Ivory Snuff Box (1912)
The Little Fortune (1915)
Peggy-Elise (1919)
Shades of Hades
Love's Greatest Mistake
Forbidden Wine
The Web
A Song of Sixpence
Gentlemen in Hades: The Story of a Damned Debutante
"Honeymoom Detective" series
Leif Erikson, the Lucky
The Film of Fear
The Torch of Liberty (1941)
Death at Eight Bells: A Novel (1937)
One Million Francs
The Pipes of Yesterday
Eternal Conflict
Death at Eight Bells
The Emigrant, a play in three acts
The First Days of Man
The First Days of Knowledge

Short stories
 "Mr. Buttles"
 "The Choice"
 "Are You a Suffragette?"

References

External links

1873 births
1943 deaths
People from Catonsville, Maryland
Rensselaer Polytechnic Institute alumni
American male dramatists and playwrights
American male screenwriters
20th-century American male writers
19th-century American male writers
Writers from Maryland
20th-century American screenwriters